Rodney Grubb (died July 18, 2005) was an American football coach and player.  He served as the interim head football coach at St. Olaf College in Northfield, Minnesota for one season in 1996, following the death of head coach Don Canfield. Grubb had served as an assistant at St. Olaf from 1974 to 1989.

Head coaching record

References

Year of birth missing
2005 deaths
Concordia Cobbers football players
St. Olaf Oles football coaches